"Quizás" ("Perhaps") is the second single released internationally by Spanish singer-songwriter Enrique Iglesias from his fourth fully Spanish language album Quizás (2002), It was released on 7 October 2002 (see 2002 in music).

Song information
The track was co-written and produced by Iglesias and Léster Méndez. The song talks about the strained relationship between Iglesias and his father. It became his 15th number-one single in the Billboard Hot Latin Tracks, thus tying him with Luis Miguel who had 15 #1's at the time.

Chart performance
The track debuted on the United States Billboard Hot Latin Tracks chart at number 28 on 30 November 2002, and rose to number 1 twelve weeks later, spending one week at the summit. The single spent 23 weeks in the chart.

See also
List of number-one Billboard Hot Latin Tracks of 2003

References

2002 singles
2002 songs
Enrique Iglesias songs
Spanish-language songs
Songs written by Lester Mendez
Songs written by Enrique Iglesias
Song recordings produced by Lester Mendez
2000s ballads
Pop ballads
Universal Music Latino singles